The Chancellor's Gold Medal is a prestigious annual award at Cambridge University for poetry, paralleling Oxford University's Newdigate Prize. It was first presented by Prince William Frederick, Duke of Gloucester and Edinburgh during his time as Chancellor of the University of Cambridge. In the mid 19th century, the topic for each year was sent out at the end of Michaelmas Term, with a requirement that entries were submitted by 31 March of the following year. A second requirement is and has been that poems must be submitted anonymously. Over the last few decades the system of set topics has been abandoned.

The winner of the medal would have the honour of reading his or her poem aloud in the Senate House on Commencement Day. The prize was first awarded in 1813 to George Waddington of Trinity College. The early lists of winners shows a considerable overlap with the list of Senior Wranglers.

This literary prize continues to exist today under the name of Chancellor's Medal for an English Poem. Intermittently it was also known as the Chancellor's Medal for (an) English Verse.

The prize takes the shape of not so much a medal, but of a rather large coin or medallion. In modern times the medallion is decked with a representation of the Queen on the front and a poetical figure on the back.

The prize has not been bestowed upon a young poet in every academic year since 1813. Where available information has been provided as to which college of the university the particular student belonged.

Partial list of recipients
1813 George Waddington, Trinity, Columbus
1814 William Whewell, Trinity, Boadicea
1815 Edward Smirke, St. John's, Wallace
1816 Hamilton Sydney Beresford Mahomet
1817 Chauncy Hare Townshend, Trinity Hall, Jerusalem
1818 Charles Edward Long, Trinity, Imperial and Papal Rome
1819 Thomas Babington Macaulay, 1st Baron Macaulay, Trinity, Pompeii
1821 Thomas Babington Macaulay, 1st Baron Macaulay, Trinity, Evening
1823 Winthrop Mackworth Praed, Trinity, Australasia
1824 Winthrop Mackworth Praed, Trinity, Athens
1825 Edward Bulwer-Lytton, 1st Baron Lytton, Trinity, Sculpture
1826 Joseph Sumner Brockhurst, St Johns (later headmaster of Camberwell Collegiate School)
1827 Christopher Wordsworth, Trinity, The Druids
1828 Christopher Wordsworth, Trinity, Invasion of Russia by Napoleon Boneparte
1829 Alfred Tennyson, 1st Baron Tennyson, Trinity, Timbuctoo
1831 George Stovin Venables, Jesus, Attempts to find a North West Passage
1842 Henry James Sumner Maine, Pembroke, Birth of the Prince of Wales
1844 Edward Henry Bickersteth, Trinity, The Tower of London
1845 Edward Henry Bickersteth, Trinity, Caubul
1846 Edward Henry Bickersteth, Trinity, Caesar's Invasion of Britain
1852 Frederic William Farrar, Trinity, The Arctic Regions
1873 Arthur Woollgar Verrall, Trinity
1899 Arthur Cecil Pigou, King's,
 1900 Frank Sidgwick, Trinity, ″Khartoum″
 1901 George Dean Raffles Tucker, Magdalene
 1902 Giles Lytton Strachey, Trinity, "Ely"
 1903 Not awarded
 1904 Robert Quirk, Kings
 1905 Arthur Conway Osborne Morgan, Trinity
 1906 Charles Mendell Kohan, Trinity
 1907 Donald Welldon Corrie, King’s
 1908 George Geoffrey Gilbert Butler, Trinity
 1909 Dennis Holme Robertson, Trinity
 1910 Dennis Holme Robertson, Trinity
 1911 Dennis Holme Robertson, Trinity
 1912 Not awarded
 1913 Not awarded
 1914 Donald Frederick Goold Johnson, Emmanuel
 1915 Philip Carrington, Selwyn
 1916 Not awarded
 1917 Harold Obbard Lee, Jesus
 1918 Hugh l'Anson Fausset, Corpus
 1919 Frederick Francis Thomas Pinto, Non-Collegiate
 1920 Colin Hercules Mackenzie, King's
 1921 Cecil Roy Leonard Falcy, Queens', Death of Napoleon
 1922 Montague Maurice Simmons, Queens
1923 David William Allun Llewellyn, St John's, St Francis of Assiss
1924 Edward Falaise Upward, Corpus Christi, Buddha
1925 Henry Hugh Thomas, Sidney Sussex, Stonehenge
1926 Alan Trevor Oldham, Emmanuel, Gallipoli
1927 Frederik John Norton also Frederik Norton, Pembroke, Orestes
1928 Kenneth Harold Ellis, Trinity, Proserpine
1929 Elsie Elizabeth Phare later Elsie Duncan-Jones, Newnham, The Bridge (first female recipient
1931 Robert Gittings also Robert William Victor Gittings, Jesus, The Roman Road
1934 Frederick William Clayton, King's, The English Countryside
1935 Olive Fraser, Girton, The Vikings (F)
1936 Terence Tiller also Terence Rogers Tiller, Jesus, Egypt
1937 Christopher Thomas Gandy, King's, The Thames
1938 John Darrel Boyd, King's, A Great Man
1939 Reginald Arthur Burrows, St Catherine's, Fire
1942 Irene Josephine Blanche Snatt, Girton, A Londoner (F)
1948 George James Moor, Downing, The Year's to Come
1949 Alan John Maurice Bird, Selwyn, Speed
1953 Alasdair Eoin Aston, Pembroke, Gloriana Rediviva
1964 Howard Brenton, St Catherine's
1966 William Paul Huw Merchant, Emmanuel
1967 Clive Wilmer, King's
1969 Alexander John Howard Martin, Jesus
1970 Elliot Alexander Grant, Christ's
1974 John Wilkinson also John Lawton Wilkinson, Jesus
1976 Charles Ellis Leftwich, St John's, Cadenzas
1977 David Colles Lloyd, King's, Ecologies
1978 Aidan Semmens, Trinity
1979 Jacqueline Osherow, Trinity (F)
1980 Michael Thomas Hutchinson, Trinity
1982 Alice Goodman also Alice Abigail Goodman, Girton, Four Poems (F)
1984 James William Noggle, Fitzwilliam, A painting of the garden
1985 Jean Hanff Korelitz, Clare, The Sounds from the Stairs and other poems (F)
1988 Joanne Marion Wiess, St. Edmund's, Untitled Poem (F)
1989 Simon James Alderson, Trinity, Memory
1992 Nicoletta Fotinos also N. I. Fotinos, Churchill, Pergamon (first non-native speaker recipient), (F)
1994 Keith Malcolm Sands, Jesus, Axis
1997 Keston Sutherland also Keston M. Sutherland, Hate's clitoris
2006 Benjamin Morris, Sonata in orange

Notes

References
 
Cambridge University Janus Records
 A list of its recipients since 1922 may be found in Graham Chainey, A Literary History of Cambridge (1986), pp. 295ff.

British poetry awards
Awards and prizes of the University of Cambridge
Awards established in 1813
1813 establishments in England